This is a list of Bemidji State Beavers players in the NFL Draft.

Key

Selections

References

Lists of National Football League draftees by college football team

Bemidji State Beavers NFL Draft